Església de Sant Serni de Nagol  is a church located in Sant Julià de Lòria, Andorra. It is a heritage property registered in the Cultural Heritage of Andorra. It was built in the 11th century.

References

Sant Julià de Lòria
Roman Catholic churches in Andorra
Cultural Heritage of Andorra